The Maillé Massacre refers to the murder on 25 August 1944 of 124 of the 500 residents of the commune of Maillé in the department of the Indre-et-Loire. Following an ambush a few days before and in reprisals against activities of the French Resistance, Second Lieutenant Gustav Schlüter and his men organized the massacre and burnt the village. Forty-eight children were among the dead. The SS unit believed to be responsible for the massacre is the SS-Feldersatzbataillon 17 of 17th SS Panzergrenadier Division Götz von Berlichingen (Lieb, 2007). In contrast to Oradour-sur-Glane, the village was rebuilt after the war to its pre-war state (Delahousse, 2008).

Development of events
On the evening of August 24, 1944, skirmishes between the French Forces of the Interior (FFI) and German troops took place near a farm in the commune of Maillé. Gustave Schlüter, commander of the German control post at Sainte-Maure-de-Touraine, mobilized his men and two train-mounted artillery pieces (Chevereau & Forlivesi, 2005; Delahousse, 2008; Payon, 1945; Lieb, 2007).

The next morning, Maillé was closed off by German forces. One artillery piece was destroyed by the attacking RAF. The first farms were then set on fire and their residents killed. About noon, the SS entered the village and the systematic killing began. Some wounded who had pretended to be dead were later shot down when they attempted to escape (Chevereau & Forlivesi, 2005; Delahousse, 2008; Payon, 1945).

About 1:00 pm the artillery bombardment began, demolishing the village and any who might have survived the initial onslaught. The soldiers were also there to ensure that survivors were shot on sight. By late afternoon calm returned, and the few survivors could only look upon the spectacle with sadness. The intervention of abbot André Payon was needed so that they could leave to take shelter in neighboring villages.

In less than four hours, entire families were slaughtered by the Waffen SS, many of whose soldiers were only 16 and 17 years old (Chevereau & Forlivesi, 2005; Delahousse, 2008; Payon, 1945).

Victims

 Paul Auger, age 60
 Eugénie Auger, née Deplaix, age 58
 François Audevard, age 41
 Achille Barret, age 37
 Germaine Beck, age 14
 Jean Beck, age 8
 Jacques Beck, age 2
 Yvonne Blanchard, age 17
 Marie Brion, née Boyer, age 60
 Magdeleine Bruneau, née Moreau, age 89
 Suzanne Brunet, née Desale, age 29
 Marcel Brunet, age 6
 Yolande Brunet, age 5
 Jacques Brunet, age 9 months
 Marie Bruzeau, née Poirier, age 30
 Louis Bourguignon, age 74
 Marie-Louise Bouguignon, née Page, age 68
 Edwige Champigny, née Ouvrard, age 37
 Jacques Champigny, age 10
 Jean Champigny, age 4
 Marie Champigny, née Morne, age 73
 Andrée Charpentier, née Rocher, age 35
 Pierre Charpentier, age 10
 Lucien Charpentier, age 20 months
 Jeanne Charret, née Rousseau, age 32
 Nadine Charret, age 10
 Michel Charret, age 11
 Henri Chedozeau, age 53
 Julien Chieppe, age 45
 Charles Chevalier, age 83
 Véronique Chevalier, age 79
 André Chevillard, age 19
 Maria Confolent, née Gambier, age 46
 Pierre Confolent, age 22
 Jehanne Confolent, age 20
 Yves Confolent, age 19
 René Confolent, age 17
 Hélène Confolent, age 14
 Jean Confolent, age 13
 Claude Confolent, age 11
 Henri Coulombeau, age 64
 Joséphine Coulombeau, née Robin, age 58
 Germaine Creuzon, née Page, age 37
 Pierrette Creuzon, age 10
 Gérard Creuzon, age 4
 Monique Creuzon, age 15 months
 Charles Creuzon, age 68
 Jeanne Creuzon, née Terrason, age 67
 Paulette Creuson, age 14
 Théodore Creuzon, age 43
 Fernand Creuzon, age 18
 André Didelin, age 40
 Jeanne Didelin, née Longe, age 38
 Jeannine Didelin, age 18
 Andrée Didelin, age 11
 Charles Didelin, age 10
 Michel Didelin, age 7
 Valérie Fialton, née Sorin, age 60
 Gérard Fialton, age 12
 Jean Fournier, age 6
 Gustave Gabillot, age 51
 Renée Gabillot, née Guiton, age 45
 Marie Gambier, née Bertrand, age 84
 Auguste Glais, age 36
 Pierre Granet, age 56
 Ernest Gouard, age 43
 Renée Gouard, née Brion, age 37
 Camille Gouard, age 11
 René Gouard, age 3
 Henri Guérin, age 51
 Jeanne Guerrier, née Prouteau, age 31
 Michel Guerrier, age 3
 Alexandre Guillochon, age 42
 Renée Guillochon, née Binois, age 37
 Éliane Guillochon, age 10
 Charles Guiton, age 79
 Charles Guiton, age 46
 Robert Guiton, age 30
 Marie Guiton, née Page, age 25
 Yvette Guiton, age 6
 Arlette Guiton, age 4
 Jackie Guiton, age 2
 Colette Guiton, née Blanchard, age 26
 Éliane Guiton, age 6
 Gérard Guiton, age 3
 Germaine Guiton, née Hodin, age 38
 Jacqueline Guiton, age 6
 Anne Guiton, née Voisin, age 77
 Joséphine Hinderscheid, née Raimbault, age 45
 Gisèle Hinderscheid, age 10
 René Jamain, age 36
 Henriette Lerasle, née Renault, age 31
 Claude Lerasle, age 9
 Pierre (ou Charles) Martigue, age 43
 René Martin, age 34
 Renée Martin, née Charpentier, age 29
 Raymond Martin, age 9
 Josiane Martin, age 4
 Danielle Martin, age 6 months
 Marguerite Menanteau, née Delaveau, age 32
 Huguette Menanteau, age 15
 Cyrille Menanteau, age 12
 Edgard Menanteau, age 6
 Mireille Menanteau, age 2
 Hubert Menanteau, age 3 months
 Jules Métais, age 31
 Simone Métais, née Goy, age 24
 Jackie Métais, age 6
 Jeannine Métais, age 4
 Justine Métais, née Méry, age 60
 Annie Meunier, age 4
 Jean Meunier, age 2 ans et demi
 Paul Millory, age 45
 Jean Millory, age 14
 Monique Pérouze, age 4
 Ernestine Ricottier, née Tartre, age 44
 Joseph Sondag, age 21
 Baptiste Sornin, age 43
 Louise Tard, née Drouard, age 75
 Armand Tartre, age 52
 Justine Tartre, née Cognault, age 71
 Auguste Thermeau, age 44
 Joseph Vincent, age 78
 Désirée Vincent, née Gatillon, age 70

Commemoration
The principal bibliographic resources are the memoirs of abbot André Payon, published for many years by the Conseil Général of the Indre-et-Loire (Payon, 1945).

Since March 9, 2006, a memorial museum, La Maison du Souvenir, has been open to the general public in the Café Métais, in Maillé. The museum shows collections of photos and artifacts commemorating the village of Maillé and those killed during the massacre (Chevereau & Forlivesi, 2005; Delahousse, 2008; Payon, 1945). A German study on German anti-partisan warfare in France during the Second World War revealed some new facts on the possible SS perpetrators (Lieb, 2007).

Prosecution
Gustav Schlüter was condemned in absentia in Bordeaux in 1953, yet he died peacefully at his home in Germany in 1965 (Chevereau & Forlivesi, 2005; Delahousse, 2008).

On August 1, 2005, the public prosecutor of Dortmund, Ulrich Maass, reopened the inquiry, resulting in a visit to Maillé in July 2008. It was clarified that Germany has no statute of limitations on war crimes (as long as the accused are Germans or were in the service of the Axis during World War Two), and German judicial system reserves the right of initiative in such cases. 
(Chevereau & Forlivesi, 2005; Delahousse, 2008)

See also

List of massacres in France
Oradour-sur-Glane massacre

References

External links
 La Maision du Souvenir memorial museum
 Website for the descendants of survivors from the Maillé Massacre (in French) 

Massacres in France
Mass murder in 1944
Massacres in 1944
World War II massacres
War crimes in France
Nazi war crimes in France
August 1944 events
1944 in France
1944 murders in France